Athymoris dibaliodes is a moth in the family Lecithoceridae. It is found in Thailand.

References

Moths described in 2010
Moths of Asia
Athymoris